Loden may refer to:
Marilyn Loden, American writer who coined the phrase "glass ceiling"
Loden cape, water-resistant material (usually green) in Austrian traditional clothing made from sheep's wool, without removing the lanolin
Loden green, greyish green color typical of Bavarian loden garments
the Loden, artifact in the Shannara series
Loden (musician), Belgian musician
A modern spelling (alongside Lothen) of Loðen or Loþen, the Old English name for the historic Scottish region of Lothian.

See also
 Lodden, a surname